In the field of enzymology, a betaine-homocysteine S-methyltransferase also known as betaine-homocysteine methyltransferase (BHMT) is a zinc metallo-enzyme that catalyzes the transfer of a methyl group from trimethylglycine and a hydrogen ion from homocysteine to produce dimethylglycine and methionine respectively:

  Trimethylglycine (methyl donor) + homocysteine (hydrogen donor) → dimethylglycine (hydrogen receiver) + methionine (methyl receiver)

This enzyme belongs to the family of transferases, specifically those transferring one-carbon group methyltransferases. This enzyme participates in the metabolism of glycine, serine, threonine and also methionine.

Isozymes

In humans, there are two isozymes, BHMT and BHMT2, each encoded by a separate gene.

Tissue distribution
BHMT is expressed most predominantly in the liver and kidney.

Clinical significance

Mutations in the BHMT gene are known to exist in humans. Anomalies may influence the metabolism of homocysteine , which is implicated in disorders ranging from vascular disease, autism, and schizophrenia to neural tube birth defects such as spina bifida.

See also
 Betaine

References

Further reading

External links
 
 

EC 2.1.1
Enzymes of known structure